Rotokas may refer to:
 Rotokas language, a language spoken in Papua New Guinea
 Rotokas alphabet, the alphabet used to write the Rotokas language
 Rotokas Record, a weapons surrender accord signed in 2001